The 1992 ISF Men's World Championship was an international softball tournament. The tournament was held in Manila and Pasig, Philippines from 20 to 28 March 1992. It was the 8th time the World Championship took place. Eighteen nations competed, including defending champions United States.

In the grand final held at the Rosario Sports Complex on March 28 and attended by 13,000 people, Canada won over runner-up New Zealand.

Bidding
New Zealand, the Philippines and the United States made bids to host the games. The town of Midland, Michigan, previous 1984 hosts, was the candidate town of the United States for the 1992 bid. The Philippines' bidding delegation was led by then Pasig Mayor, Mario Raymundo. The Philippines previously hosted the championships in Marikina in 1972. At an International Softball Federation convention in Vancouver, British Columbia, Canada in 1989, The Philippines were awarded hosting rights for the tournament.

Venues
The Rosario Sports Complex in Pasig and the Rizal Memorial Ball Park in Manila.

Pools composition

Preliminary round

Pool A

Pool B

Final round

Semifinals

Final

Grand Final

Final standings

(*) Note: The Netherlands is not included at the final standing table by the ISF despite the team playing at least a match at the tournament. No sources has been retrieved for the reason for the Netherlands' omission at the ISF table. The Netherlands' standing after the elimination round was retrieved from Manila Standard.

References

External links
Final standings

ISF Men's World Championship
1992 ISF Men's World Championship
1992 in Philippine sport
Men's Softball World Championship
March 1992 sports events in Asia
Sports competitions in Manila
20th century in Manila